Keith B. Tierney is a Canadian fish scientist and academic. He is a full professor at the University of Alberta as well as editor of the Canadian Journal of Fisheries and Aquatic Sciences. He is interested in how water quality interacts aquatic vertebrates.

Education

PhD, Simon Fraser University, 1 January 2004 - 31 August 2007
Master of Business Administration, University of British Columbia, September 2001 - May 2002
Master of Science, Simon Fraser University, January 1998 - May 2001
Bachelor of Science, Simon Fraser University, September 1991 - May 1996

Publications
Towards a comprehensive catalog of zebrafish behavior 1.0 and beyond

References

External links

Tierney at Google Scholar

Academic staff of the University of Alberta
Year of birth missing (living people)
Canadian ichthyologists
Living people